Src-like-adapter 2 is a protein that in humans is encoded by the SLA2 gene.

Function 

This gene encodes a member of the SLAP family of adapter proteins. The encoded protein may play an important receptor-proximal role in downregulating T and B cell-mediated responses and inhibits antigen receptor-induced calcium mobilization. This protein interacts with Cas-Br-M (murine) ecotropic retroviral transforming sequence c. Two transcript variants encoding distinct isoforms have been identified for this gene.

Interactions 

SLA2 has been shown to interact with Cbl gene.

References

Further reading